This is a discography of Greek-Cypriot recording artist Michalis Hatzigiannis, who has been certified for the sales of 645,000 albums and a further 170,000 singles by IFPI Greece since crossing over to the Greek music industry in 1998.

Albums

Studio albums

As lead artist

As featured artist

Live albums

Compilation albums

Box sets

Singles

As lead artist

As featured artist

Remixe singles

Promotional singles

Reissues

As lead artist

As featured artist

Soundtracks

Composing and other appearances

References

Discographies of Cypriot artists
Pop music discographies